Didier Robert de Vaugondy (1723, Paris – 1786) was an 18th-century French geographer.

The son of Robert de Vaugondy, he was appointed geographer of the King by Louis XV, geographer of the Duke of Lorraine by Stanisław Leszczyński, King of Poland, Grand Duke of Lithuania, Duke of Lorraine. In 1773, he became royal censor for works related to geography, navigation and travels.

Works 
 L’Europe : divisée en ses états, empires, royaumes et républiques. Delamache, Paris 1767
 Collaboration to the Encyclopédie, Vol 7: Foang – Gythium, Paris 1757.
 Article Fuseau (Geog.), (p. 385)
 Article Géographie, (p. 608–613)
 Article Globe (Astronom. & Géogr.), (p. 707–711)

See also
Sea of the West

Bibliography 
 Jean-François Gauvin: Traditionen des Globenbaus um 1750: die Valks, Didier Robert de Vaugondy und Åkerman im Vergleich, in: der Globusfreund: wissenschaftliche Zeitschrift für Globen- und Instrumentenkunde 51–52 (2003–2004), (ISSN 0436-0664), (p. 47–48)
 Mary Sponberg Pedley: Bel et utile: the work of Robert de Vaugondy family of mapmakers, Tring, Herts, England 1992,.
 Robert de Vaugondy, Didier, in: Frank Arthur Kafker, The encyclopedists as individuals: a biographical dictionary of the authors of the Encyclopédie, Oxford 1988, ((p. 330–333).
 Mary Sponberg Pedley: The Map Trade in Paris, 1650–1825, in: Imago Mundi: the international journal for the history of cartography 33 (1981), (ISSN 1479-7801), (p. 33–45)
 Edward Dahl, Jean-Francois Gauvin, Sphaerae Mundi: Early Globes at the Stewart Museum, Montreal, Éditions du Septentrion et McGill-Queen's University Press, 2000, 280 p. ((. Voir « Globes by Didier Robert de Vaugondy », (p. 167 and fol.)

References

Sources 
 Ferdinand Hoefer, Nouvelle Biographie générale, vol.37, Paris, Firmin-Didot, 1824, p. 23-4.
 Pierre Larousse, Grand Dictionnaire universel du XIXe, vol.13, Paris, Administration du grand Dictionnaire universel, p. 663.

External links 
 Didier Robert de Vaugondy on IdRef
 Didier Robert de Vaugondy on Christies

18th-century geographers
French geographers
French cartographers
Contributors to the Encyclopédie (1751–1772)
Scientists from Paris
1723 births
1786 deaths